Boaedon is a genus of African lamprophiids consisting of the "brown" house snakes. The genus was originally described by Duméril but the species contained were reclassified as Lamprophis by Fitzinger in 1843, this taxonomy remained widely accepted until November 2010 when a phylogenetic study was published by C.M.R Kelly et al. who resurrected the Boaedon clade. Although commonly regarded as belonging to the Colubridae, primary literature usually lists them, and related species, as belonging to the family Lamprophiidae within the superfamily which includes the venomous cobras and mambas, Elapoidea.

Species 
There are currently 21 species in Boaedon, however new species are frequently being described:
Angolan house snake, Boaedon angolensis Bocage, 1895
Boaedon bedriagae 
Bocage’s brown house snake, Boaedon bocagei 
Branch’s brown house snake, Boaedon branchi 
Cape house snake, Boaedon capensis Duméril & Bibron, 1854
Frade’s brown house snake, Boaedon fradei 
Brown house snake, Boaedon fuliginosus (Boie, 1827)
Seychelles house snake, Boaedon geometricus (Schlegel, 1837)
Striped house snake, Boaedon lineatus Duméril & Bibron, 1854
Coastal house snake, Boaedon littoralis Trape & Mediannikov, 2016
Long-lined house snake, Boaedon longilineatus Trape & Mediannikov, 2016
Dotted house snake, Boaedon maculatus (Parker, 1932)
Boaedon mendesi 
Namibian house snake, Boaedon mentalis (Günther, 1888)
 Olive house snake, Boaedon olivaceus (Duméril, 1856)
Central African lined house snake, Boaedon paralineatus Trape & Mediannikov, 2016
Boaedon perisilvestris Trape & Mediannikov, 2016
Radford's house snake, Boaedon radfordi Greenbaum, Portillo, Jackson, & Kusamba, 2015
Yellow house snake, Boaedon subflavus Trape & Mediannikov, 2016
Boaedon upembae (Laurent, 1954)
Boaedon variegatus Bocage, 1867
Hallowell's house snake, Boaedon virgatus (Hallowell, 1854)

Appearance 
All members of the genus Boaedon are small snakes, generally attaining lengths of little more than 4 feet (120 cm) in length.  Sexually dimorphic, females are always larger than males who attain lengths of approx. 2 feet (60 cm) there is some variance between species and between geographic locales of species.

Overall body colouration is typically sandy brown to black but green, orange, red and a variety of other locale specific variations do exist.  All species are nocturnal by nature and present with vertically elliptic pupils, they also present with few exceptions a v-shaped set of stripes stretching from the rostral scale through the eye to the rear of the head. Body pattern varies between species, B. olivaceus, B. upembae, B. mentalis, & B. fuliginosus are all naturally pattern less, B. capensis and B. maculatus both have patternless variants and B. lineatus typically has lateral striping running the length of the body. These are highly variable snakes and confusion is common when attempting to distinguish them from one another.

Geographic range 
House snakes occur in all of sub-Saharan Africa, inhabiting dense forests and deserts as well as all other habitats in between.  They are commonly found around towns where they will feast on the rodents which gather there.

External links 
 
 House Snake Forums
 House Snake Captive care Guide

References 

Snakes of Africa
Snake genera
Lamprophiidae
Taxa named by André Marie Constant Duméril
Taxa named by Gabriel Bibron
Taxa named by Auguste Duméril